The biomedical model of medicine is the current dominating model of illness used in most Western healthcare settings, and is built from the perception that a state of health is defined purely in the absence of illness. The biomedical model contrasts with sociological theories of care, and is generally associated with poorer outcomes and greater health inequality when compared to socially-derived models. 

Forms of the biomedical model have existed since before 400 BC, with Hippocrates, the "father of medicine" advocating for physical aetiologies of illness. Despite this, the model did not form the dominant view of health until the 1800s during the Scientific Revolution.

Criticism of the model generally surrounds its perception that health is independent of the sociocultural setting in which it occurs, and can be defined one way, across all populations. Similarly, the model is also criticised for its view of the health system as socially and politically neutral, and not as a source of social or cultural power or embedded into the structure of society.

Features of the biomedical model 
In their book Society, Culture and Health: an Introduction to Sociology for Nurses, health sociologists Dr Karen Willis and Dr Shandell Elmer outline eight 'features' of the biomedical model's approach to illness and health. They are:
 doctrine of specific aetiology: that all illness and disease is attributable to a specific, physiological dysfunction
body as a machine: that the body is formed of machinery to be fixed by medical doctors
mind-body distinction: that the mind and body are separate entities that do not interrelate
reductionism
narrow definition of health: a state of health is always the absence of a definable illness
individualistic: that sources of ill-health are always in the individual, and not the environment which health occurs
treatment versus prevention: that the focus of health is on diagnosis and treatment of illness, not prevention
treatment imperative: that medicine can 'fix the broken machinery' of ill-health
neutral scientific process: that health care systems and agents of health are socially and culturally detached and irrelevant

See also 
 Biopsychosocial model
 Medical model
 Medical model of disability
 Social model of disability
 Trauma model of mental disorders

References 

Medical models